Jerome Edward Trager "Jerry" Messing is an American actor. He is known for a recurring role in the TV program Freaks and Geeks (1999-2000).

Career
Messing played Pugsley Addams in the 1998 film Addams Family Reunion, and had a reoccurring role on the short-lived cult NBC dramedy Freaks and Geeks as Gordon Crisp, an optimistic geek with trimethylaminuria. He also appeared in five episodes of Even Stevens and two episodes of Mr. Show with Bob and David. Messing has not appeared in an acting role since 2003.

In 2011, Messing appeared in a music video for artist Viennie V, playing a contestant on a dating show. As of 2019, the video has over 770,000 views.

"Fedora Guy" Meme 
On October 31, 2013, a picture of Messing appeared on Reddit. The photo features Messing wearing a trilby and grinning at the camera. After being widely disseminated online, Messing was labeled "Fedora Guy" and the picture became synonymous with "neckbeard" and "nice guy" stereotypes, as well as a joke at the expense of atheists. Messing has stated in subsequent interviews that the picture was an outtake for a headshot photoshoot he took when attempting to restart his acting career, after briefly attending Florida International University to study psychology. As Messing noted, "I'm certainly not thrilled with the communities the photo has come to represent, but it isn't something I can really do anything about—so I don't let it bother me."

Fedora Productions 
In January 2020, Messing started the YouTube channel

COVID-19 Diagnosis 
In August 2021, it was revealed that Messing had been admitted to a Florida hospital and put on a ventilator after contracting COVID-19. He had previously received his first dose of the Pfizer–BioNTech COVID-19 vaccine and was awaiting his second dose when he became sick. In September 2021, after spending two weeks in a coma, Messing was removed from the ventilator and taken out of the ICU, able to breathe on his own. He had lost the ability to walk but is currently going through rehabilitation.

Filmography

Film

Television

References

External links

His Facebook page

1986 births
Living people
Male actors from Los Angeles County, California
American male child actors
American male film actors
American male television actors
20th-century American male actors
21st-century American male actors
Internet memes